Petrit Halilaj (born 1986) is a Kosovar visual artist living and working between Germany, Kosovo and Italy. His work is based on documents, stories, and memories related to the history of Kosovo.

With his husband Alvaro Urbano, Halilaj is a joint tutor at Beaux-Arts de Paris, in Paris, France.

Early life
Born in SFR Yugoslavia, now Kosovo, Halilaj left the country at the age of 13 with his family during the Yugoslav Wars of 1991–2001. At a refugee camp in Albania, a team of Italian psychologists, hoping to help the children process the trauma of the war, gave Halilaj felt-tip markers, with which he began to make drawings about his experiences.

Settled in Italy, Halilaj studied at the Brera Academy of Fine Arts in Milan.

Career
During the 6th Berlin Biennale in 2010, Halilaj exhibited a sculptural reconstruction of a house built by his parents, to replace the family home that was levelled by bombing during the 1998–1999 Kosovo war.

Halilaj represented the Republic of Kosovo at the 55th Venice Biennale in 2013.

Halilaj had several solo exhibitions, including one at the New Museum in New York in 2017–2018 and one at the Hammer Museum in Los Angeles in 2018–2019.

Halilaj created a large site-specific installation of giant sculptural flowers in 2020 for Madrid's Palacio de Cristal.

In July 2021, Halilaj and Urbano collaborated on an installation of "huge fabric flowers" at the Kosovo National Library to celebrate the 5th annual Kosovo Pride Week.
 According to the New York Times:

In October 2021, an exhibit opened at Tate St Ives of an installation by Halilaj inspired by his youthful marker drawings done in the refugee camp.
 

In the exhibit, visitors walk among hanging cutouts of images from the drawings blown up to a huge scale. Approached from the entrance, the cutouts show "a fantasy landscape of exotic birds and palm trees," but when the visitors turn back to the entrance, "they find that some of the suspended forms have been printed on the reverse with a more macabre selection of Halilaj’s doodles: soldiers, tanks, wailing figures, burning houses."

Solo exhibitions
2009 – Back to the Future, curated by Albert Heta, at Stacion – Center for Contemporary Art Prishtina, Pristina, Kosovo
2013 – Kosovar Pavilion, 55th Venice Biennale, curated by Kathrin Rhomberg, at the Arsenale, Venice, Italy
2013–2014 – Petrit Halilaj: Poisoned by men in need of some love, curated by Elena Filipovic, at WIELS, Brussels, Belgium
2015–2016 – Petrit Halilaj: Space Shuttle in the Garden, curated by Roberta Tenconi, at HangarBicocca, Milan, Italy
2017–2018 – Petrit Halilaj: RU, curated by assistant curator Helga Christoffersen, at New Museum, New York City, NY, USA
2018–2019 – Hammer Projects: Petrit Halilaj, organised by adjunct curator Ali Subotnick and curatorial associate MacKenzie Stevens, at Hammer Museum, Los Angeles, CA, USA
2018–2019 – Shkrepëtima, curated by Leonardo Bigazzi, at Fondazione Merz, Turin, Italy
2021–2022 – Petrit Halilaj: Very volcanic over this green feather, curated by Anne Barlow with assistant curator Giles Jackson, Tate St Ives, Saint Ives, UK

Group exhibitions
2010 – 6th Berlin Biennale for Contemporary Art: what is waiting out there, curated by Kathrin Rhomberg, at KW Institute for Contemporary Art, Berlin, Germany
2011 – Ostalgia, curated by Massimiliani Gioni, at the New Museum, New York City, NY, USA
2015–2016 – Super Superstudio: Radical Art and Architecture, curated by Andreas Angelidakis, Vittorio Pizzigoni, and Valter Scelsi, at Padiglione d'Arte Contemporanea (PAC), Milan, Italy
2017 – 57th Venice Biennale: Viva Arte Viva, curated by Christine Macel, at the Central Pavilion, Venice, Italy
2019 – Hotel Europa: Their Past, Your Present, Our Future, curated by Théo-Mario Coppola with associate curator Livia Tarsia in Curia, at Open Space of Experimental Art, Tbilisi, Georgia
2019 – Homeless Souls, curated by Marie Laurberg, at the Louisiana Museum, Humlebæk, Denmark

Collections
Centre Pompidou, Paris, France
, Turin, Italy
Museum of Contemporary Art Chicago, Chicago, IL, USA
Museum of Modern Art, Warsaw, Warsaw, Poland
Tate Modern, London, UK

Awards
He received the Mario Merz Prize and a special mention of the jury at the 57th Venice Biennale, both in 2017.

Books
Roberta Tenconi, ed., Petrit Halilaj: Space Shuttle in the Garden, Milan: Mousse Publishing, 2016, 160 p., English / Italian,

References

Kosovan artists
Kosovo Albanians
People from the District of Mitrovica
1986 births
Living people
Brera Academy alumni
Albanian artists